The men's 30 metre team dueling pistol (originally called team competition with revolver and pistol (duel shooting)) was a shooting sports event held as part of the 1912 Summer Olympics shooting programme. The competition was held from Saturday, 29 June 1912 to Wednesday, 3 July 1912.

Twenty-eight sport shooters from seven nations competed.

Medalists

Results

References

External links
 
 

Shooting at the 1912 Summer Olympics